Mount Mourne Plantation is a former Southern plantation and  historic house located in Mount Mourne, Iredell County, North Carolina. It was built in 1836, and is a two-story, five-bay transitional Federal / Greek Revival style frame dwelling.  It features a hipped roof entrance portico with four fluted Tuscan order columns.

It was added to the National Register of Historic Places in 1974.

History
The plantation house was built by Major Rufus Reid (1797-1854). Cotton, wheat and corn were grown with the forced labor of as many as 88 enslaved people. In its heyday, the Plantation was one of the largest in the area, and the second largest in Iredell County. The proceeds of forced labor made Rufus Reid one of the wealthiest and most prosperous planters in not only the area, but the state as a whole.

At present
It is currently privately owned, and is closed to the public. The plantation gave its name to the modern-day community of Mount Mourne, North Carolina, in which the home is located.

References

External links

Historic American Buildings Survey in North Carolina
Plantation houses in North Carolina
Houses on the National Register of Historic Places in North Carolina
Federal architecture in North Carolina
Greek Revival houses in North Carolina
Houses completed in 1836
Houses in Iredell County, North Carolina
National Register of Historic Places in Iredell County, North Carolina